The 2023 Big Ten Conference men's ice hockey tournament was the ninth tournament in conference history. It was played between March 3 and March 18, 2023, on-campus locations. As the tournament winner, Michigan earned the Big Ten's automatic bid to the 2023 NCAA Division I men's ice hockey tournament.

Format
The tournament featured a format with all games taking place on the campus of the higher-seeded teams. The tournament opened with three best-of-three quarterfinal series, as the second, third and fourth-seeded teams each hosting a series. The top-seeded team had a bye to the single-elimination semifinals. The highest-seeded team remaining after the semifinals hosted the championship game.

Conference standings

Bracket
Teams were reseeded for the semifinals

Note: * denotes overtime periods.

Results

Quarterfinals

(2) Michigan vs. (7) Wisconsin

(3) Ohio State vs. (6) Penn State

(4) Notre Dame vs. (5) Michigan State

Semifinals

(1) Minnesota vs. (5) Michigan State

(2) Michigan vs. (3) Ohio State

Championship

(1) Minnesota vs. (2) Michigan

Tournament awards

All-Tournament Team
 G: Justen Close (Minnesota)
 D: Seamus Casey (Michigan)
 D: Luke Hughes (Michigan)
 F: Logan Cooley (Minnesota)
 F: Adam Fantilli * (Michigan)
 F: Rutger McGroarty (Michigan)
* Most Outstanding Player

References

Big Ten Men's Ice Hockey Tournament
Big Ten Men's Ice Hockey Tournament